Hypatopa nex is a moth in the family Blastobasidae. It is found in Costa Rica.

The length of the forewings is 5–6 mm. The forewings are white intermixed with pale-brown scales on the basal third and brown intermixed with brown scales tipped with pale brown and white on the apical two thirds. The hindwings are translucent brownish grey, gradually darkening towards the apex.

Etymology
The specific name is derived from Latin nex (meaning a violent death).

References

Moths described in 2013
Hypatopa